Monte Blue Charles (March 27, 1930 – May 8, 1992) was an American gridiron football player and coach. He served as the head football coach at the University of Wisconsin–Platteville from 1966 to 1968, the University of Wisconsin–Superior from 1970 to 1971, and the University of Wisconsin–Stevens Point from 1972 to 1976, compiling a career college football coaching record of 48–44–1.

Charles was drafted by the Green Bay Packers in the 1951 NFL Draft. He was appointed interim head football coach Wisconsin–Stevens Point in October 1972 after Pat O'Halloran was fired four games into the season. Charles resigned from his post at Wisconsin–Stevens Point in the spring of 1977 after he was stricken with leukemia. He died on May 8, 1992, in Stevens Point, Wisconsin, after suffering a heart attack.

Head coaching record

College

Notes

References

External links
 

1930 births
1992 deaths
American football fullbacks
Hamilton Tiger-Cats coaches
Hillsdale Chargers football players
Missouri Southern Lions football coaches
Montreal Alouettes coaches
Northern Illinois Huskies football coaches
Saskatchewan Roughriders coaches
Winnipeg Blue Bombers coaches
Wisconsin–Platteville Pioneers football coaches
Wisconsin–Stevens Point Pointers football coaches
Wisconsin–Superior Yellowjackets football coaches
High school football coaches in Michigan
People from Vicksburg, Michigan
Players of American football from Michigan
Coaches of American football from Michigan